Chloe Lanier  is an American actress. She is best known for her role on the ABC soap opera General Hospital as the villainous Nelle Benson. For her portrayal, Lanier was nominated for three consecutive Daytime Emmy Awards for Outstanding Younger Actress in a Drama Series, winning in 2018.

Career
Lanier began her career in 2009 when she starred as Lisa in the movie The Effects of Tragedy. She later joined the cast of Army Wives in 2012 in the recurring role of Penny. In 2014, she guest-starred in an episode of NCIS as Emma Carter and appeared in the film North Blvd as Young Elaine.

In 2015, she appeared in two episodes of General Hospital as Young Patricia Spencer for the 52nd anniversary storyline. Lanier described her audition for the role as being very secretive. Listed as "Girl No.2,” she initially thought it was a background role. After reading the character’s description, she was impressed which led to a change of heart. She decided to go for it after being further convinced by her boyfriend. In the same year, she guest-starred in Stalker as Sage. 

When General Hospital was initially planning to cast the role of Nelle Benson, Lanier was busy appearing as Chelsea on Kingdom. However, because Laura Wright (Carly Corinthos) and Executive Producer Frank Valentini were adamant that if anyone should play Nelle, it should be Lanier, the storyline was put on hold for her until she became available. Lanier later revealed to Soap Opera Digest that Frank Valentini had called her personally and convinced her to accept the role. She returned to General Hospital in 2016, this time in the contract role of Nelle Hayes [Benson]. Her first episode as Nelle aired on August 8, 2016.

In November 2016, she worked on the independent film, Gorman, also titled Quail Lake, where she played the lead role of Brittany. 

Lanier departed the contract role as Nelle Benson on General Hospital in August 2018, but made several guest appearances later that year. She again reprised the role of Nelle the week of June 10, 2019 and was on was on a recurring status with the soap following that reprisal, appearing intermittently through September 2020. She returned again to briefly reprise Nelle in September 2022.

Personal life
Before portraying Nelle Benson on General Hospital, Lanier worked as a respite caregiver for children with Autism. In March 2020, it was reported that she had symptoms of COVID-19, but was unable to get tested due to the limited availability.

Filmography

Awards and nominations

References

External links
 

Living people
21st-century American actresses
American film actresses
American television actresses
American soap opera actresses
Daytime Emmy Award winners
Daytime Emmy Award for Outstanding Younger Actress in a Drama Series winners
1992 births